CTI may stand for:

Companies and organizations
 CTI Consultants, engineering consulting firm in Richmond, Virginia
 CTI Electronics Corporation, a manufacturer of industrial computer peripherals
 CTI Móvil, a Latin American mobile network operator
 CTI Records, a jazz record label
 Chung T'ien Television, CTi TV,  a cable television network in Taiwan
 City Telecom (Hong Kong), telecommunications provider
 Garda Counter-Terrorism International, a section of the Irish national police

Schools
 CTI Education Group higher education institution, South Africa
 Central Training Institute Jabalpur, India
 Curtiss-Wright Technical Institute, trade school for aircraft maintenance training
 DePaul University School of Computer Science, Telecommunications and Information Systems

Other
 Cyber threat intelligence, Cyber threat intelligence
 Canberra Tennis International, Australian tennis tournament
 Comparative Tracking Index, for measuring the electrical breakdown (tracking) properties of insulating material
 Computer telephony integration, technology allowing computers and telephones to be integrated or coordinated
 Cuito Cuanavale Airport, an Angolan airport, IATA code
 Cryptologic technician interpretive, a US Navy cryptologic technician rating
 Ivory Coast, ITU code
 Conquer the Island, a computer game mode where areas on a gamemap must be conquered